KTOZ-FM (95.5 FM), also identified on-the-air as Alice 95.5, is a radio station broadcasting a hot AC format. Licensed to Pleasant Hope, Missouri, United States.  The station is currently owned by iHeartMedia, Inc. and licensed as iHM Licenses, LLC.

Prior to Alice, KTOZ aired an alternative rock format as "Z95.5 The Edge - Springfield's New Rock Alternative". Prior to 1998 the station was known as "Channel Z95 - Springfield's Super Station". Past call sign: KZBE—known as "B95" which aired a classic hits format.

Currently, the station airs shows from Ryan Seacrest, Johnjay & Rich, Clint Girlie, the latter being the station's program director.

External links
 

TOZ
Hot adult contemporary radio stations in the United States
Adult top 40 radio stations in the United States
1984 establishments in the United States
Radio stations established in 1993
IHeartMedia radio stations